is a train station serving as the terminus of the Kintetsu Keihanna Line in Nara, Nara Prefecture, Japan.

Line
Kintetsu Keihanna Line (Station Number: C30)

Layout
The station has an island platform serving two elevated tracks.

History
On March 27, 2006, the station began services when the Keihanna Line extension between Ikoma and Gakken Nara-Tomigaoka opened.

Stations next to Gakken Nara-Tomigaoka

	

Railway stations in Japan opened in 2006
Railway stations in Nara Prefecture
Stations of Kintetsu Railway
Buildings and structures in Nara, Nara